Aukštaitija (literally in Lithuanian: Upper lands) is the name of one of five ethnographic regions of Lithuania. The name comes from lands being in upper basin of Nemunas River or being relative to Lowlands up to Šiauliai.

Geography
Aukštaitija is in the northeast part of Lithuania and also encompasses a small part of Latvia and Belarus. The largest city and, though not in any strict political sense, the considered capital of the region is Panevėžys. The largest cities (by population) are:
 Panevėžys – 84,587
 Jonava – 26,423
 Utena – 25,397
 Kėdainiai – 22,677
 Ukmergė – 20,154
 Visaginas – 18,024
 Radviliškis – 15,161

The region has many lakes, mainly on the eastern side.

History

Historically Aukštaitija had been correspondent to the Duchy of Lithuania up to the 13th century. Its initial capital most likely was Kernavė. In the treaty of Gediminas of 1322, Aukštaitija is named terra Eustoythen (land of Aukštaitians). Some German sources also titled Grand Duke Gediminas, after whom the Gediminids dynasty is named after, as Rex de Owsteiten. Aukštaitija was mentioned as Austechia in Chronicon terrae Prussiae written around 1326. Politically, since the end of the 13th century, it comprised the Duchy of Vilnius/Lithuania and Duchy of Trakai, and perhaps was employed to refer to them both taken together. Since the 15th century, corresponding Trakai Voivodeship and Vilnius Voivodeship made up Aukštaitija, as a political and ethnically based unit, also known as Lithuania proper.

Demographics
Local people mainly speak the Aukštaitian dialect of Lithuanian. Under the new classification of dialects Lithuanian is divided into just two dialects, Aukštaitian and Samogitian with all previous dialects being classified as subdialects. The Sudovian and Dzūkian dialects are also considered subdialects of Aukštaitian now, therefore the specific subdialect spoken in Aukštaitija is known as East Aukštaitian.

The region has Russian and Belarusian minorities in the east, sub-dialects there use more loan words from those languages. However the usage of dialects, as in Lithuania in general, is decreasing.

See also
 Aukštaitija National Park
 Samogitia

References

Lithuanian ethnographic regions
Historical regions in Lithuania